George Louis, Prince of Erbach-Schönberg (1 January 190327 January 1971) was the 3rd Prince of Erbach-Schönberg, elder son of Alexander, 2nd Prince of Erbach-Schönberg.

Early life
George Louis was the second child and first son of Alexander, Prince of Erbach-Schönberg (1872–1944), and his wife, Princess Elisabeth of Waldeck and Pyrmont (1873–1961), daughter of George Victor, Prince of Waldeck and Pyrmont and his wife Princess Helena of Nassau. He was related with the British, Dutch, and Spanish Royal families.

He was a first cousin of:
Pauline, Princess of Wied (1877–1965), last senior member of the House of Württemberg.
Wilhelmina of the Netherlands (1880–1962), Queen-regnant of the Netherlands.
Princess Alice, Countess of Athlone (1883–1981)
Charles Edward, Duke of Saxe-Coburg and Gotha (1884–1954), last reigning Duke of Saxe-Coburg and Gotha.
Josias, Hereditary Prince of Waldeck and Pyrmont (1896–1967)

Marriage and family
George Louis married on 2 July 1925 in Schönberg, Marie-Marguerite von Deringer (25 December 1903 – 22 December 1967).

They had three children, eleven grandchildren and seven great-grandchildren:
Louis, Prince of Erbach-Schönberg (17 October 1926 – 23 November 1998), married on 9 March 1946 Rosemarie Moshage (22 September 1927 – 25 May 2015), and had four children and one granddaughter:
Prince Burckhard of Erbach-Schönberg (7 April 1951 – 30 June 1998)
Dietrich, Prince of Erbach-Schönberg (b. 27 March 1954) he married Monika Recknagel on 19 May 1984. They have one daughter:
Princess Elizabeth of Erbach-Schönberg (22 June 1985)
Princess Uta of Erbach-Schönberg (1 August 1955)
Princess Patricia of Erbach-Schönberg (15 December 1967)
Princess Edda Marie of Erbach-Schönberg (10 April 1930 – 3 March 1993) she married Karl Josef Dierkes (1924-2008) on 2 May 1951 and they were divorce in 1960. They have four children and three grandchildren:
Anja Dierkes (11 April 1952) she has two children from her first marriage with Mr. Ruser also has a son with her second husband. 
Jannes Ruser
Nana Ruser
Linus Dierkes
Petra Dierkes (5 July 1953)
Jan-Wilm Dierkes (17 July 1956-9 May 1959)
Tatjana Dierkes (29 April 1960)
Prince Maynolf of Erbach-Schönberg (13 May 1936 - 8 December 2020) he married Marie Katharine Markert on 14 May 1959 and they were divorced in 1970. They have one daughter He remarried Erika List on 16 March 1970 and they were divorced in 1972. He remarried again Solveig Schlegel in 1976. They have two children and three grandchildren.
Princess Xenia of Erbach-Schönberg (23 May 1963)
Princess Isabelle of Erbach-Schönberg (24 August 1977) she married  Andreas Ellinger in 1998. They have one son:
Alexandra Ellinger (2000)
Prince Peter of Erbach-Schönberg (11 August 1981) he married Corinna Schaffer in 2003. They have two children:
Prince Sandro of Erbach-Schönberg (2003)
Princess Cecilie of Erbach-Schönberg (2007)

Ancestry

Notes and sources
Genealogisches Handbuch des Adels, Fürstliche Häuser, Reference: 1980 117
The Royal House of Stuart, London, 1969, 1971, 1976, Addington, A. C., Reference: II 351

1903 births
1971 deaths
People from the Grand Duchy of Hesse
House of Erbach-Schönberg